Karmele Makazaga Urrutia (born 14 April 1964) is a Spanish team handball player who played for the club Hernani and for the Spanish national team. She was born in San Sebastián. She competed at the 1992 Summer Olympics in Barcelona, where the Spanish team placed seventh.

References

1964 births
Living people
Sportspeople from San Sebastián
Spanish female handball players
Olympic handball players of Spain
Handball players at the 1992 Summer Olympics
Handball players from the Basque Country (autonomous community)
20th-century Spanish women